Roamer may refer to:

 Roamer (watchmaker), a Swiss watch manufacturer
 Roamer (horse), an American racehorse
 Roamer, a car named after the race horse and built by the US based Barley Motor Car Co.
 , more than one United States Navy ship

See also 
 Romer (disambiguation)
 Roam (disambiguation)
 Rohmer, surname